The Indonesian Military Regional Commands (abbreviated ) are military districts of the Indonesian Army which function for territorial defence of various regions within the country. They cover one or multiple provinces.

History 
Their organization was established by General Sudirman, following the model of the German Wehrkreise system. The system was later codified in Strategy Order No.1, signed by General Sudirman in November 1948.

The Army's structure underwent various reorganisations throughout its early years. From 1946 to 1952, the Army was organized into combined arms divisions. These were consolidated in 1951, and then dissolved in 1952.  From 1952 to 1958–59, the Army was organised into seven Territorial Armies  composed of regiments and independent formations at battalion level and below. In August 1958, the Indonesian Army reconsolidated its territorial organization. This created sixteen regional commands, which retained earlier divisional titles; the Siliwangi Division, for example, became . The Kodam were subdivided administratively into Areas (the former territorial regiments), Districts (the former regimental battalions) and District Sectors, and operationally composed of a number of speciality battalions and in some regional commands, an infantry brigade.

A reorganisation in 1985 made significant changes in the army chain of command. The four multiservice Regional Defence Commands and the National Strategic Forces Command were eliminated from the defence structure, re-establishing the Military Regional Commands as the key organisation for strategic, tactical, and territorial operations for all services. The 16 regions were reduced to just 10. The chain of command flowed directly from the ABRI commander via the Chief of Staff of the Army to the ten territorial commanders, and then to subordinate army territorial commands. In 1999, the number of regions grew to 10, and today, there are around 15 in active operation.

The territorial commands incorporate provincial and district commands each with infantry battalions, sometimes a cavalry battalion, artillery, or engineers. The number of activated infantry brigades is increasing. Some have Raider battalions attached.

Organization of Regional Commands 
Each Regional Command is led by a major general, assisted by a chief of staff who holds the rank of brigadier general. s oversee several territorial formations under its command, which are:

They are further divided into two types which are type "A" and type "B". They are commanded by a brigadier general for type "A" and a colonel for type "B" respectively. It is below the Kodam and oversee several Kodims
They are further divided into three types which are "independent", type "A" and type "B". They are commanded by a Colonel (for Independent and type "A"), and a Lieutenant Colonel for type "B" respectively. It is below the Korem and oversee several Koramils.
They are further divided into two types, "A" and "B", commanded by a Major for type "A" and a Captain for type "B" respectively. It is below the Kodim and oversee several Babinsa officers. 
 or  NCO" is a senior army Non-commissioned Officer (usually holding the rank of  Sergeant Major) or a senior Enlisted rank personnel (usually holding the rank of  Master corporal) who is in charge for carrying out territorial development and monitoring duties for a community in the  level.

The office of the Regional Commander is assisted by the following territorial departments:
 Office of the Regional Inspector General
 Office of the Regional Secretariat
 Regional Military Police Command – responsible for military law enforcement in the territory
 Regional Public Affairs and Press Office – responsible for public affairs, media and civil-military relations
 Office of the Regional Adjutant General
 Regional Military Physical Fitness and Sports Office – responsible for physical fitness and sports affairs
 Regional Medical Department – responsible for medical affairs
 Regional Veterans and National Reserves Administration – responsible for military reserves formation and veterans' affairs
 Regional Topography Service
 Regional Chaplaincy Corps – chaplaincy service for personnel who are Muslims, Christians, Hindus, Buddhists and Confucianists
 Regional Finance Office – responsible for financial activities
 Regional Legal Affairs Office 
 Regional HQ and HQ Services Detachment
 Regional C3 Unit
 Regional Information and Communications Technology Office
 Regional Logistics and Transportation Division
 Regional Signals Division
 Regional Ordnance Department
 Regional Engineering Division
 Regional Cyber Operations Service
 Regional Intelligence Command
 Liaison offices of the Navy and Air Force formations in each Military Region

Operationally, each "" is organized as a territorial infantry division which oversee several Subordinate combat units:
Infantry Brigade
directly reporting independent Infantry battalions (including Raider Infantry)
independent Infantry battalions which are under the Military Area Command or ""
Cavalry Squadron and/or Cavalry Reconnaissance Troop (Separate)
Field Artillery Battalion/s
Air Defense Artillery Battalions/Detachments
Combat Engineers Battalion/s
Construction Engineers Battalions/Detachments

Military regions 
The following is a list of Military Regional Commands in Indonesia:

Former Military Regional Commands

References 

Military regional commands of Indonesia
Indonesian Army